Carlos Basualdo is an Argentinian curator who is now the Keith L. and Katherine Sachs Curator of Contemporary Art at the Philadelphia Museum of Art and Curator at Large at MAXXI-Museo nazionale delle arti del XXI secolo in Rome, Italy.
Basualdo has written extensively for scholarly journals and art publications, including Artforum, ARTnews and The Art Journal.

Education
Basualdo received his degree in literature from the National University of Rosario in 1982, and also participated in the Independent Study Program of the Critical Studies Program at the Whitney Museum of American Art, New York (1994–1995).

Career
In 2006, Basualdo initiated two exhibition series at the Philadelphia Museum of Art titled Notations and Live Cinema, both of which are devoted to the permanent collection and video. He was the lead organizer of Bruce Nauman: Topological Gardens that represented the United States at the 2007 Venice Biennale, where it was awarded the Golden Lion for Best National Participation. He organized a survey exhibition of the work of the Italian artist Michelangelo Pistoletto (2009), a collaboration between the Philadelphia Museum of Art and MAXXI. Basualdo was part of the curatorial team for Documenta 11, the 50th Venice Biennale, and conceived and curated Tropicalia: A Revolution in Brazilian Culture, which traveled from the MCA Chicago to the Barbican Gallery in London (2004-2005) as well as the Bronx Museum in New York and the Museu de Arte Moderna in Rio de Janeiro (2006-2007). In 2012 Basualdo curated Dancing Around the Bride: Cage, Cunningham, Johns, Rauschenberg and Duchamp, an exhibition about the relationships between the work of Marcel Duchamp, John Cage, Merce Cunningham, Jasper Johns, and Robert Rauschenberg.

References

Argentine art curators
Living people
People associated with the Philadelphia Museum of Art
National University of Rosario alumni
Year of birth missing (living people)